Dogtown and Z-Boys is a 2001 documentary film produced by Agi Orsi and directed by Stacy Peralta. The documentary explores the pioneering of the Zephyr skateboard team in the 1970s (of which Peralta was a member) and the evolving sport of skateboarding. Using a mix of film of the Zephyr skateboard team (Z-Boys) shot in the 1970s by Craig Stecyk, along with contemporary interviews, the documentary tells the story of a group of teenage surfer/skateboarders and their influence on the history of skateboarding (and to a lesser extent surfing) culture.

Synopsis
Dogtown and Z-Boys, narrated by Sean Penn, begins with the history of skateboarding in Southern California and how it had been strongly influenced by the surf culture in the surrounding areas of Santa Monica and Venice, nicknamed Dogtown. Surf shop owners Jeff Ho, Skip Engblom, and Craig Stecyk established the Zephyr Skateboard Team with local teenagers from broken homes. The sport of skateboarding continued to evolve as the Z-Boys continued to bring edgy moves influenced by surfing. During one of California's record-breaking droughts, local backyard pools were emptied and became hotspots for these young skateboarders looking for places to skateboard. The members of the Zephyr team gained notability and national attention when they competed in skateboard championships and started to receive media attention for their skills as young athletes. Testimonials and commentary provided by the members and founders of the Zephyr team combined with the rock-and-roll soundtrack and vintage footage all come together in this documentary about the history and lives of the original Z-Boys and skateboarding subculture of California.

Production
The documentary features vintage video footage and photos of the Zephyr skateboard team from the 1970s, along with contemporary interviews from the original members of the Z-Boys group. The film combines the 8-mm and 16-mm vintage footage with modern editing and a soundtrack crafted from music of the 1970s era.

Dogtown and Z-Boys was directed by Stacy Peralta, an original member of the Zephyr team, and written by Peralta and Craig Stecyk, a leading surf and skateboard film producer and photojournalist.

The film operated on a budget of $400,000 financed by Vans, Inc. Stecyk and photojournalist Glen E. Friedman, were the film's co-writer and co-producer, respectively, Daniel Ostroff and Stephen Nemeth were also co-producers, and Debra MacCulloch and Christine Triano were associate producers involved with the film.

Cast
The documentary includes footage, commentary, and interviews from eleven of the original members of the Z-Boys team, along with the team's co-founders, skateboarding champions, and other relevant skateboarding figures, journalists, and musicians from the era.

 Sean Penn as the narrator 
 Jay Adams (Zephyr Skate Team member) as himself
 Tony Alva (Zephyr Skate Team member) as himself
 Stacy Peralta (Zephyr Skate Team member) as himself
 Jeff Ament as himself
 Steve Caballero as himself 
 Skip Engblom (Zephyr Co-Founder) as himself
 Craig Stecyk (Zephyr Co-Founder) as himself
 Tony Hawk as himself
 Henry Rollins as himself
 Tom Sims as himself
 Peggy Oki (Zephyr Skate Team member) as herself
 Jeff Ho (Zephyr Co-Founder) as himself

Reception
The documentary initially gained notability after its debut at the Sundance Film Festival where it won several awards. The film was well received by many critics, including reporter Steve McKee of The Wall Street Journal who stated that the documentary had opened with "boffo reviews" from around the country. The film received a rating of 92% on Rotten Tomatoes and a generally favorable rating of 76 on Metacritic. Stephen Holden of The New York Times said the film was a "giddy, thrilling, rock 'n' roll-saturated history of skateboarding in Southern California."

On the opening weekend of April 2002, Dogtown and Z-Boys made $103,355. By August 2002, the film had grossed $1,293,295 in the United States. According to Peralta in a 2004 interview, "Dogtown has sold over a million DVDs and more than 700,000 VHS."

Awards and recognition
Dogtown and Z-Boys was entered in the 2001 Sundance Film Festival and won two awards: the Audience Award and Directing Award. The film also won the Independent Spirit Award for Best Documentary in 2001.

Music

See also
Lords of Dogtown

References

External links
 
 Dogtown – The Legend of the Z-Boys - The book that inspired the film

2001 films
2001 documentary films
Sundance Film Festival award winners
American sports documentary films
Skateboarding films
Sony Pictures Classics films
Documentary films about surfing
Documentary films about Los Angeles
American surfing films
2000s English-language films
2000s American films